Liew Ah Kim is a Malaysian politician. He was the Member of Parliament for Seputeh from 1986 to 1999 under Democratic Action Party and the Member of Selangor State Legislative Assembly for Kajang from 1978 to 1982.

Politics 
He was the Member of Parliament for Seputeh before quitting from DAP in 1998 and established Malaysian Democratic Party together with Wee Choo Keong and was the Deputy Chairman for the party. He tried to defend his seat under the ticket of the new party in 1999 Malaysian general election, but he failed and lost to Teresa Kok. In 2002, he rejoined DAP and contested for the Kampar parliamentary seat but lost to the BN candidate. He had also contested in the 2022 Central Executive Committee Election but was not chosen as a member.

Election results

See also 
 Malaysian Democratic Party
 Wee Choo Keong
 Seputeh (federal constituency)
 Kajang (state constituency)

References 

Living people
Malaysian politicians of Chinese descent
Year of birth missing (living people)
Democratic Action Party (Malaysia) politicians